Lawrence Cowle Phipps (August 30, 1862 – March 1, 1958) was a United States Senator representing Colorado from 1919 until 1931.

Biography
Lawrence Cowle Phipps was born on August 30, 1862, in Amity, Pennsylvania, the son of William Henry Phipps and Agnes McCall. He grew up in Pittsburgh, Pennsylvania, where he joined the Carnegie Steel Company as a clerk.  His uncle, Henry Phipps, was the second-largest shareholder in the company.  Lawrence Phipps eventually advanced to first vice president.  He retired in 1901 and moved to Denver, Colorado, where he was active in investments, and was president of the Colorado Taxpayers Protective League in 1917.

In 1918, Phipps was elected to the United States Senate as a member of the Republican Party, defeating the Democratic incumbent, John Franklin Shafroth.  Phipps was reelected in 1924 on the memorable slogan, "A vote for Lawrence C. Phipps is another vote for Coolidge." He did not run again in 1930.

Between 1931 and 1933 Phipps and his third wife, the former Margaret Rogers, built the Phipps Estate, in part to provide jobs during the Great Depression.  Mrs. Phipps donated the mansion and grounds to the University of Denver in 1964.

Phipps died on March 1, 1958, in Santa Monica, California. He was entombed in the Fairmount Mausoleum at Fairmount Cemetery in Denver.

Legacy
Phipps is the namesake of Phippsburg, Colorado.

References

Further reading
Official Congressional Biography, which credits both the U.S. Senate Historical Office and the biography below:
Dictionary of American Biography; Schlup, Leonard. "Colorado Crusader and Western Conservative: Lawrence C. Phipps and the Congressional Campaign of 1926." Essays in Colorado History 9 (1989): 25–36.

External links
 

1862 births
1958 deaths
Colorado Republicans
Phipps family
Politicians from Denver
Politicians from Pittsburgh
Republican Party United States senators from Colorado